Monte Granero is a peak in the Cottian Alps, in western Piedmont, northern Italy. It has an elevation of 3,170 m. It is located between the Val Pellice and the Valle Po, not far from the boundary with France.

Administratively it's divided between the Metropolitan City of Turin and the province of Cuneo, both in the Piedmont region.

The Pellice torrent starts from the Monte Granero's western slopes. The Monte Meidassa is located nearby.

SOIUSA classification 
According to the SOIUSA (International Standardized Mountain Subdivision of the Alps) the mountain can be classified in the following way:
 main part = Western Alps
 major sector = South Western Alps
 section = Cottian Alps
 subsection = southern Cottian Alps
 supergroup = catena Aiguillette-Monviso-Granero
 group = gruppo Granero-Frioland
 subgroup = gruppo del Monte Granero 
 code = I/A-4.I-C.9.a

References

Maps
 Italian official cartography (Istituto Geografico Militare - IGM); on-line version: www.pcn.minambiente.it
 French  official cartography (Institut Géographique National - IGN); on-line version:  www.geoportail.fr

Mountains of Piedmont
Mountains of the Alps
Three-thousanders of Italy